The National Live Music Awards (NLMAs) are a broad recognition of Australia's diverse and successful live industry, celebrating the diversity and success of the Australian live scene – recognising the best vocal talents and musicians alongside the best venues, events and festivals. The awards contain both national and state focused categories, voted on by the live industry (including fellow musicians, media, venues, bookers), with select public voted categories. The national awards are revealed at a gala event, while the State and Territory awards are revealed at satellite events in their respective capital cities. They awards have been held annually since 2016.

History 
The National Live Music Awards were proceeded by the AU Live Music Awards, held in 2014 and 2015 and run by music publication The AU Review. That website's founder, Larry Heath, serves as the director of these awards.

At the inaugural edition of the National Live Music Awards took place on 29 November 2016, there were eight live award shows, one held in each capital city, across every state and territory, awarding the regional winners, while at the gala show in Sydney, the nationwide winners were announced.

The second event was held on 7 December 2017. Sydney band Gang of Youths won four awards at the event, while Melbourne group Camp Cope won three.

The third annual event was held on 6 December 2018, with a new award to recognise live music photographers and the introduction of "The Sheddy", the new name of the Live Drummer award in memory of the late Iain Shedden, who was one of the award's judges in its inaugural year. Magic Dirt were the recipients of the inaugural Live Legends Hall of Fame Induction. 

The fourth annual event was held on 4 December 2019 and saw Electric Fields take home three awards, including two of the biggest of the night, Live Act of the Year and Live Voice of the Year.. Deborah Conway was inducted into the Live Legends Hall of Fame.

The fifth annual event is scheduled to occur on 20 October 2020.

Eligibility
Eligibility applied to any musician or band that played a concert in Australia between 1st of September and 31st of August of any year. Music venues who have been active during this period, as well as music festivals that have taken place between these dates, will also be eligible for their respective awards.

Awards by year
To see the full article for a particular year, please click on the year link.

See also
 Iain Shedden

References

National Live Music Awards
Australian music awards
Recurring events established in 2016
Awards established in 2016
2016 establishments in Australia